The Ottawa BlackJacks are a Canadian professional basketball team based in Ottawa, Ontario. The BlackJacks compete in the Canadian Elite Basketball League (CEBL). They play their home games at TD Place Arena, an arena shared with the Ottawa 67's of the Ontario Hockey League.

Background 

The BlackJacks are the second professional basketball team in Ottawa, the Ottawa Skyhawks played at Canadian Tire Centre in 2012 to 2014.

Team history 

2020 Season

Dave Smart was named the inaugural General Manager of the Blackjacks on December 18, 2019.

2021 Season

On July 17, the BlackJacks signed former CEBL champion and NBA G-Leaguer Negus Webster-Chan after he was released by the Saskatchewan Rattlers. On July 19, guard Johnny Berhanemeskel was inacativated due to his contractual obligations with the French team Chorale Roanne Basket. On July 23, the BlackJacks signed three new players, Jadon Cohee, Mamadou Gueye, and 
Antonio Williams. Additionally, forward Eric Kibi was released after appearing in only one game. On July 27, the BlackJacks secured a playoff spot for the second straight season with an 82-69 win over the Saskatchewan Rattlers. In August, the BlackJacks signed former Saskatchewan Rattler center Chad Posthumus. In the playoffs, the Blackjacks upset the 3rd seeded Hamilton Honey Badgers 96-94 in the quarter-finals. However, they went on to lose to the eventual champion Edmonton Stingers in the semi-finals for the second straight year.

2022 Season

In August 2021, the BlackJacks announced Jevohn Shepherd had signed a contract extension to return as the general manager. In November, they announced that Charles Dubé-Brais would also return as head coach. On February 16, 2022, they re-signed Chad Posthumus, who had previously joined the Edmonton Stingers for the 2021–22 BCL Americas.

Players

Current roster

Season-by-season record

References

External links 
 Official website

Basketball teams established in 2019
2019 establishments in Ontario
Basketball in Ontario
Sports teams in Ottawa
Canadian Elite Basketball League teams